Zahra Sadr-Azam Nouri is an Iranian reformist politician who former serves as a member of the City Council of Tehran. In 1996, she was appointed by Gholamhossein Karbaschi as the mayor of Tehran's 7th municipal district, making her the first woman to hold office as mayor.

She is now the head of the commission for Health, Environment and Urban Services at the Council.

References

Living people
Tehran Councillors 2017–
Union of Islamic Iran People Party politicians
Mayors of districts in Tehran
Year of birth missing (living people)